Paraeuophrys is a small genus of jumping spiders first described by Dmitri V. Logunov in 2020.  it contains only two species native to Fiji and Sumatra, respectively: P. bryophila and P. sumatrana.

See also
 Euophrys
 List of Salticidae genera

References

Further reading

Salticidae genera